Cédric Blaisbois is a French filmmaker. Blaisbois has primarily directed music videos for electronica acts such as Huoratron and Mr Flash.  He has also designed album artwork for a variety of musicians and directed short movies. In 2012, he was approached by Paramount Pictures to direct a movie version of his controversial music video Huoratron's "Corporate Occult", but nothing came of early discussions.

Early work

After graduating in Fine Arts from the ENSAD Blaisbois work as a graphic designer blending modern elements with classic design to produce artwork for record labels and French house artists such as Kavinsky. Blaisbois then began directing, retooling his design experience to shoot commercials and music videos inspired by art house directors such as John Carpenter, David Cronenberg and John Landis. Blaisbois signed with Partizan Midi-Minuit production company in 2011.

Music videos

Blaisbois has had ties to Ed Banger Records since his first production "Flesh" for Mr Flash. Videos for Huoratron’s "Corporate Occult" and Raveyards’s "Together We Play" are perhaps his best known. In 2016, Billboard ranked "Corporate Occult" number 1 as "the scariest, goriest, freakiest, most intense music video ever."

Short films
In 2019, Vice Media pointed how Blaisbois faithfully narrated the nightlife of young Venezuelans in Nicolás Maduro’s Country, for his very first short film "Autocannibalism".

Commercials

Blaisbois has directed a handful of commercials for companies including Converse, Nissan, Lacoste and Canal+.

Personal life

Blaisbois was married to model Solweig Rediger-Lizlow.

Videography

 "Corporate Occult" (2011) video for Huoratron
 "Flesh" (2011) video for Mr Flash
 "Together We Play" (2013) video for Raveyards
 "Shoes are boring" (2013) - commercial for Converse
 "Lose my mind" (2017) - video for Chris Lake
 "Autocannibalism" (2019) - Short Film for Huoratron
 "Balcón" (2020) - video for Famasloop

References

External links

Advertising directors
French music video directors
Living people
Film people from Paris
Year of birth missing (living people)
École nationale supérieure des arts décoratifs alumni